Lärabar is a brand of energy bars produced by General Mills. The bars come in a variety of flavors such as Apple Pie, Carrot Cake, Cinnamon Roll, and Mint Chip Brownie.

History
Lärabar was created by Denver native Lara Merriken, who was looking to make a "very healthy product that tasted delicious". According to the General Mills website, Merriken's inspiration for the snack occurred during a hiking trip in 2000 through the Rocky Mountains of Colorado. As she was running down the mountain, she was inspired to create a food bar that was made out of only fruits, nuts and spices. The umlaut on the ä is decorative.

The bars were first introduced for sale in the United States on April 14, 2003. The original flavors were Cherry Pie, Apple Pie, Cashew Cookie, Banana Bread, and Chocolate Coconut Chew. 

In 2008, General Mills acquired the original producer of Lärabar, Humm Foods. The product line has been expanded to more than 30 varieties, including high-protein bars and bars for children.

In 2019, the Lärabar range launched in the UK.

Flavors
The thirty Lärabar flavors offered are:
 Almond Butter Chocolate Chip
 Almond Cookie
 Apple Pie
 Banana Bread
 Banana Chocolate Chip
 Blueberry Muffin
 Carrot Cake
 Cashew Cookie
 Cherry Pie
 Chocolate Chip Brownie
 Chocolate Chip Cookie Dough
 Chocolate Hazelnut Swirl
 Cinnamon Raisin Cookie
 Cinnamon Roll
 Cocoa Coconut Chew
 Coconut Chocolate Chip
 Gingerbread (Only available at Christmas)
 Key Lime Pie
 Lemon Bar
 Mint Chip Brownie
 Peanut Butter & Jelly
 Peanut Butter Banana
 Peanut Butter Chocolate Chip
 Peanut Butter Cookie
 Pumpkin Pie (Only available at Halloween)
 Pecan Pie
 Pineapple Upside Down Cake
 Snickerdoodle (Only available at Christmas)
 Strawberry Chocolate Chip

Reviews
An April 2007 review in the Pittsburgh Post-Gazette praised Lärabar, writing "The bar is moist and chewy, tart and tasty. None of the medicinal tastes of other protein bars." The bar's "authentic" taste and use as a breakfast meal have also been complimented.

Recalls 
In January 2009, General Mills voluntarily recalled Peanut Butter Cookie flavor Lärabar for fear of salmonella contamination. No illnesses were reported.

References

External links
 Official US website
Official Canada website
 Official UK website
 Lärabar on General Mills website

Energy food products
General Mills brands
Products introduced in 2003
2000 establishments in Colorado
Companies based in Denver
2008 mergers and acquisitions